Tilton railway station was a railway station serving the village of Tilton on the Hill, in Leicestershire, England. on the Great Northern and London and North Western Joint Railway. It opened in 1879 and closed in 1953. To the north of the station was Marefield Junction.

References

Disused railway stations in Leicestershire
Railway stations in Great Britain opened in 1879
Railway stations in Great Britain closed in 1953
Former Great Northern Railway stations
Former London and North Western Railway stations